Baogang may refer to:
 Baosteel Group ("Baogang" is the pinyin of the Chinese short name)
 Baoshan Iron & Steel Co., Ltd. ("Baogang" is the pinyin of the Chinese short name)
 Baotou Steel ("Baogang" is the pinyin of the Chinese short name)
 Baogang, Guangzhou, an area in Guangzhou city

See also
 Baogang Tailings Dam, a tailings dam owned by Baotou Steel
 , or Baogang Dadao, a major road in Guangzhou city
 Baogang Dadao station, a metro station in Guangzhou city